Mustafizur Rahman (Bengali: মুস্তাফিজুর রহমান; born 6 September 1995) is a Bangladeshi international cricketer. He is a left-arm fast-medium bowler. He won the Emerging Player Award in his first T20 World Cup in 2016 after taking 9 wickets in just 3 matches including a fifer against New Zealand (5/22; Best bowling figure for a losing side). He is called "The Fizz" and he is the only overseas player to win the Emerging Player Award in IPL (2016; Sunrisers Hyderabad).

Mustafizur made his international cricket debut in a Twenty20 International (T20I) match against Pakistan in April 2015. Later that year, he played his first One Day International and Test matches against India and South Africa, respectively. 
Before his international career, Mustafizur played in the 2014 Under-19 Cricket World Cup.

Early and personal life 
Mustafizur grew up in the small town of Satkhira in Khulna, Bangladesh. He is the youngest of Abul Qasem Gazi and Mahmuda Khatun's six children. His father is an enthusiastic fan of cricket. This affected his education as he occasionally missed school to play cricket.

Prior to discovering his bowling talents, Mustafizur played as a batsman with a tennis ball. According to him, he took inspiration from  Pakistani pacer Mohammad Amir who is his idol.

On 15 March 2019, along with several members of the Bangladesh test team, he was moments from entering the Al Noor mosque in Christchurch, New Zealand when a terrorist attack began. All members of the team were "deeply affected". Mustafizur went on to get married on 22 March. Mustafizur's brother was hopeful that marriage could help him "overcome the shock" of witnessing the attack in New Zealand.

Early career 
In 2012, Mustafizur travelled to Bangladesh's capital Dhaka to try out for a fast-bowlers camp. Prior to that, scouters first encountered him in an Under-17 tournament in Satkhira. He was admitted to the Bangladesh Cricket Board's foundation of fast bowling. Soon he was selected to the Bangladesh Under-19 side for the 2014 Under-19 Cricket World Cup in UAE, where he took a total of eight wickets.

Mustafizur started both his First-class cricket and List-A cricket from 2014, representing Khulna Division and Abahani Limited, respectively. He was picked for Bangladesh A's tour of West Indies.

International career

Emergence

Mustafizur began his international career in a twenty overs match against Pakistan on 24 April 2015, where he took the wickets of Shahid Afridi and Mohammad Hafeez, two veteran Pakistani batsmen.

In June 2015, India toured Bangladesh for one Test and three One Day Internationals. Mustafizur was picked in the ODI squad. In his first match of the series, Mustafizur gave signs of his potential against the strong Indian batting line-up by taking a five-wicket haul off 9.2 overs in the first match. Bangladesh won the match and Mustafizur became the tenth bowler in the history of ODIs to take five wickets on debut. In the second ODI, Mustafizur took another six wickets. This helped him to earn the record of most wickets of any bowler after two ODIs, surpassing the record previously held by Zimbabwe's Brian Vitori. He completed the last ODI with 2 wickets and made history by taking 13 wickets in a three-match ODI series.

The following month, Mustafizur took 5 wickets in three ODIs to help Bangladesh win the series against South Africa by 2–1. He made his Test debut in the same series versus South Africa where he picked up 4 wickets.

Injury problems

In the month of November, Bangladesh hosted Zimbabwe for three ODIs and two T20s. Mustafizur played a salient role in the ODI matches, taking a total of 8 wickets. For his performances in 2015, he was named in the World ODI XI by ICC. He was also named in the ODI XI of the year 2015 by ESPNcricinfo and Cricbuzz. He captured his third five-wicket haul in the last game. He could not contribute much in the T20 series, though he bowled economically, which resulted both sides sharing a win. The next year in January, Bangladesh again played with Zimbabwe in four T20s. Mustafizur played in the first two matches, which they won. While bowling in the second T20I against Zimbabwe in January 2016, Mustafizur injured his shoulder. Following that, he was dropped from the squad for the first time since debut.

During the Asia Cup held in the next month, he was again sidelined from the team due to his side strain, playing only the first three games. He was able to play against Australia, India and New Zealand in the 2016 ICC World Twenty20 held in India in March. He became the first Bangladeshi bowler to grab five wickets in the history of T20 World Cup after taking five wickets for 22 runs against New Zealand. He took total of 9 wickets in three matches in the 2016 edition. He was named as 12th man in the 'Team of the Tournament' for the 2016 T20 World Cup by the ICC.

Mustafizur was again unable to play all matches when Bangladesh toured New Zealand during December 2016 and January 2017. He played his first Test match since August 2015 against Sri Lanka at Galle in March 2017, taking eight wickets in the series.

In April 2018, he was one of ten cricketers to be awarded a central contract by the Bangladesh Cricket Board (BCB) ahead of the 2018 season.

On 29 May 2018, Mustafizur was ruled out of an upcoming three-match T20I series against Afghanistan due to a toe injury.

2019-present
In April 2019, he was named in Bangladesh's squad for the 2019 Cricket World Cup. On 5 July 2019, in the match against Pakistan, Mustafizur took his 100th wicket in ODIs. He finished the tournament as the leading wicket-taker for Bangladesh, with twenty dismissals in eight matches. Following the World Cup, the International Cricket Council (ICC) named Mustafizur as the rising star of the squad.

In September 2021, he was named in Bangladesh's squad for the 2021 ICC Men's T20 World Cup.

Domestic career

Bangladesh Premier League
Mustafizur's first professional Twenty20 career outside international cricket was the Bangladesh Premier League, where he played for Dhaka Dynamites in its 2015 season. He took 14 wickets in 10 matches in that tournament. In October 2018, he was named in the squad for the Rajshahi Kings team, following the draft for the 2018–19 Bangladesh Premier League. In November 2019, he was selected to play for the Rangpur Rangers in the 2019–20 Bangladesh Premier League.  In January 21, he was selected to play for the Comilla Victorians have announced the squad for the BPL 2022 season. Mustafizur Rahman selected in icon category and  contract for Bangladesh Premier League 2021-22 season.

Indian Premier League
In February 2016, Mustafizur was drafted by Sunrisers Hyderabad in the 2016 IPL auction. He took 17 wickets in 16 matches in the tournament where his team won the title. He was named as "Emerging Player of the Tournament", the first overseas player to receive this award.

In December 2016, he was retained by the Sunrisers Hyderabad in the 2017 IPL auction. He was doubtful about missing the first-leg of the tournament.

In January 2018, he was bought by the Mumbai Indians in the 2018 IPL auction. In February 2021, he was bought by the Rajasthan Royals from his base price of INR 1.00 crore in the 2021 IPL auction. In February 2022, he was bought by the Delhi Capitals in the auction for the 2022 Indian Premier League tournament. He played 8 match for Delhi capital and took 8 wicket.

NatWest T20 Blast
In March 2016, English side Sussex announced that they had signed Mustafizur as their second overseas player for the T20 Blast competition.
He picked up four wickets while giving away 23 runs in his debut match against Essex. After another match, he faced a shoulder surgery which sidelined him for six months.

Pakistan Super League
Mustafizur was selected by Lahore Qalandars in the Pakistan Super League. The BCB was reluctant to let him play there. However, the issue was resolved when Mustafizur got a shoulder injury in early 2016, thus preventing him from playing in the PSL.

Playing style 

Mustafizur achieved success in the beginning of his international career by bowling off cutters, a type of bowling which moves away (from the right-hander) off of the pitch. Mustafizur stated on a press conference in June 2015 that he first discovered the technique after his fellow cricketer, Anamul Haque insisted him to bowl a slower delivery. According to former Indian cricketer Maninder Singh, his slower balls are difficult to read.

Records and achievements
The governing body of cricket, the International Cricket Council, included Mustafizur on the ICC ODI Team of the Year in 2015, recognizing him as one of the top cricketers of that year. He was the first Bangladeshi cricketer to achieve this and the second to be selected for any ICC team after Shakib Al Hasan.
 In December 2016, he was named the ICC Emerging Cricketer of the Year, the first Bangladeshi player to win one of the ICC's annual awards. Mustafizur was also included as the 12th man in the 2016 ICC World Twenty20 Men's Team of the Tournament. He won the ESPNcricinfo Award for the Best T20 performance of the year 2016 for his maiden T20I five-wicket haul against New Zealand during the World T20.
Mustafizur won the Best Athlete of the Year Award from the Bangladesh Sports Press Association (BSPA) of the year 2015.
On 29 May 2016, he became the first and so far the only foreign cricketer to win IPL's Emerging player of the year.
On 27 January 2018, Mustafizur took his 50th ODI wicket in a tri-series final against Sri Lanka by bowling Upul Tharanga, becoming the fastest Bangladeshi bowler to 50 ODI wickets in 27 matches.
Mustafizur again included ICC ODI Team of the Year 2018. He become the first Bangladeshi cricketer to achieve this twice.
On 5 July 2019, Mustafizur took his 100th ODI wicket in 2019 Cricket World Cup against Pakistan by bowling Haris Sohail, becoming the fastest Bangladeshi bowler to reach the milestone in 54 matches. By doing so, he also became the fourth fastest in the World to reach 100 wickets, leaving Australian speedster Brett Lee behind him. Lee reached the milestone of 100 wickets in 55 matches.
On 18 September 2019, Mustafizur became quickest Bangladeshi, quickest fast bowler and fourth quickest bowler to take 50 T20I wickets.
In the annual ICC Awards in January 2022, Mustafizur was included in ICC Men's ODI Team of the Year for the year 2021.
 Named in ICC Men's T20I Team of the Year for the year 2021.

References

External links 

1995 births
Living people
Bangladeshi cricketers
Bangladesh Test cricketers
Bangladesh One Day International cricketers
Bangladesh Twenty20 International cricketers
People from Satkhira District
Cricketers who have taken five wickets on One Day International debut
Khulna Division cricketers
Dhaka Dominators cricketers
Lahore Qalandars cricketers
Sunrisers Hyderabad cricketers
Rajshahi Royals cricketers
Mumbai Indians cricketers
Sussex cricketers
Abahani Limited cricketers
Mohammedan Sporting Club cricketers
Bangladesh South Zone cricketers
Rajasthan Royals cricketers
21st-century Bengalis
Delhi Capitals cricketers
Comilla Victorians cricketers